In telecommunications, optical modulation amplitude (OMA) is the difference between two optical power levels, of a digital signal generated by an optical source, e.g., a laser diode.

It is given by

where P1 is the optical power level generated when the light source is "on," and P0 is the power level generated when the light source is "off."  The OMA may be specified in peak-to-peak mW.

The OMA can be related to the average power  and the extinction ratio 

In the limit of a high extinction ratio, .  However, OMA is often used to express the effective usable modulation in a signal when the extinction ratio is not high and this approximation may not be valid.

External links
OMA presentation by Optillion, New Orleans, September 2000

Optical communications